"The Power of Love" is a song co-written and originally recorded by American singer-songwriter Jennifer Rush in 1984. It was released as the fifth single from her debut album, Jennifer Rush (1984), and has since been covered by Air Supply, Laura Branigan and Celine Dion.

Recorded in Frankfurt, Germany (where Rush is based) and released in West Germany without much success in late 1984, Rush's original version reached number one on the UK Singles Chart in October 1985 and subsequently became the biggest-selling single of the year in the UK as Rush became the first female artist ever to have a million-selling single in the UK—it became the ninth best-selling single of the decade. It also topped the charts in several other European countries, as well as Canada, Australia, New Zealand and South Africa.

Dion's version peaked at number one in the United States, Canada, and Australia, and hit the top ten in several more countries in 1994. The song has been translated into several languages, becoming a pop standard.

Overview
"The Power of Love" was first recorded in Frankfurt, West Germany by Jennifer Rush for her 1984 eponymous album. This was a year after the band Frankie Goes to Hollywood conceived a song with the same title. It was released as a single in West Germany in December 1984. In June 1985, "The Power of Love" was issued as a single in the United Kingdom, where it topped the chart for five weeks in October 1985 and became the best-selling single of the year. As of March 2017, it had sold 1.45 million copies in the UK. The success of the song saw Rush perform it ‘‘live’’ on the BBC’s Top of the Pops in late 1985.

The massive success of "The Power of Love" in the UK followed with widespread international success for the single in the last months of 1985 and the first of 1986, including a German re-release with a resultant number-nine charting. Eventually "The Power of Love" reached number one in Australia, Austria, Ireland, New Zealand, Norway, South Africa and Spain (where Rush topped the chart with a version in Spanish called "Si tú eres mi hombre y yo tu mujer", translated as "If you are my man and I'm your woman"), number three in Switzerland, Sweden and Belgium, and number seven in the Netherlands.

CBS held off on releasing "The Power of Love" in North America feeling the disc was too European. It finally saw release in the United States and Canada in January 1986 but despite rising to number one in Canada, "The Power of Love" failed to become a significant US hit, stalling at number 57 on the Billboard Hot 100 for the week ending of April 5, 1986, and spending 13 weeks within the Hot 100. The song was performed by Rush on The Tonight Show Starring Johnny Carson in March 1986 and American Bandstand in April 1986.

Critical reception
Michele Greppi from The Atlanta Journal-Constitution named "The Power of Love" the "best cut" of the album, complimenting Rush's voice, noting that her "operatic training shows in her incredible range (with no apparent loss of power or flexibility at either top or bottom)". Tom Ewing of Freaky Trigger stated that it's "a song about how love removes your own sense of scale, makes existence itself unfamiliar, so the disorientating disconnect between it and anything resembling my emotional reality makes a sort of warped sense." He added that the chorus is "so memorable". Alan Jones from Music Week complimented it as "frankly superior". Stephen Holden from The New York Times remarked that Rush "has a distinctive alto that combines an almost folkish intonation with a declamatory, quasi-operatic delivery. It is a voice that doesn't fit comfortably into any category." Richard Defendorf from The Orlando Sentinel declared it as a "goopy ballad". People magazine wrote that "what's most impressive is Rush's voice. Throaty, intense and wide-ranging". The reviewer also noted that there is "intelligent passion" in the "broody" "The Power of Love". In an retrospective review, Pop Rescue praised it as a "fantastically classic power ballad" and "flawless", noting that the singer's vocals are "rich, strong, and wonderfully spine tingling". Greg Kennedy from Red Deer Advocate viewed the song as "plaintive" and "poignant". A writer for The Stage declared it a "superballad".

Australian music channel Max included "The Power of Love" in their list of "1000 Greatest Songs of All Time" in 2011.

Music video
The accompanying music video of "The Power of Love" was directed by German director Michael Leckebusch. It was filmed in New York City. As the video begins, we see the city in the early morning hours. Some villainous types are walking around an empty office, looking for something. They are being discovered by Rush's man, who obviously works at nights. Then the focus switches to Rush who is seen leaving Madison Square Garden. She starts singing and at home, she opens the door to her bedroom and finds her man lying asleep. When the chorus starts, Rush is standing in a freight elevator that is moving upwards. There are glimpses of the villainous men pushing her man to do things for them. Some scenes show Rush wearing black sunglasses, standing on the dock by the sea, while she watches the guys meeting on a pier to plot something. They are also hitting her man on the street by car. Apparently Rush is trying to help him out of the hands of these villains. Towards the end, she walks alone through the city in the evening hours, singing. At home, she once again opens the bedroom door, checking that her man is lying there asleep and then she shuts the door. As of January 2023, the video had generated more than 115 million views on YouTube.

Official versions

 Original album version (6:00)
 Special radio edit (4:43) [This is an edit of the original album version]
 Orchestral remix (6:00)

 International album version (5:45) [Remixed by Walter Samuel]
 Remix (4:20) [Remixed by Walter Samuel. This is an edit of the international album version]
 Extended remix (7:10) [Remixed by Walter Samuel. Different mix to the international album version/remix]

Track listings

Charts

Weekly charts

Year-end charts

Decade-end charts

All-time charts

Certifications and sales

Air Supply version

British/Australian duo Air Supply covered "The Power of Love" for their 1985 eponymous album. Since the song was sung by Russell Hitchcock, a man, the gender roles were reversed in the lyrics ("I'm your lady and you are my man" became "You are my lady and I am your man"). It was released as a single in July 1985 in the United States, and later in Canada and New Zealand. Their version was titled "The Power of Love (You Are My Lady)" so as not to be confused with "The Power of Love" by Huey Lewis and the News which was on the charts at the same time. Air Supply's version was a moderate success in New Zealand and Canada, reaching the top 40 in both countries in late 1985. In the US, it peaked at number 68. Their cover was featured in the 2017 film Death Note.

Track listing

Credits and personnel
 Russell Hitchcock – vocals
 Graham Russell – background vocals
 Steve Lukather – guitar
 Greg Phillinganes – keyboards
 David Paich – keyboards
 Steve Porcaro – keyboards, synthesizer
 Nathan East – bass
 John "JR" Robinson – drums

Charts

Laura Branigan version

American singer Laura Branigan recorded "The Power of Love" under the title "Power of Love" for her fifth studio album, Touch (1987). Produced by David Kershenbaum, the track was released in October 1987 as the album's second single and reached number 26 on the US Billboard Hot 100 that December, becoming Branigan's seventh and final top-40 entry. "Power of Love" also peaked at number 19 on Billboards Hot Adult Contemporary chart.

Branigan would say of "Power of Love": "There's a song on this album" ("Power Of Love") "that to me is the ultimate in singing. It's a real emotional tear-your-heart-out kind of song. It's a classic torch song with today's feeling. I think those are the ones that live on forever.

"It has a range that keeps going on and on. It is really challenging vocally and yet it is really emotional. Emotion of the most important thing for me.".

Track listing

Credits and personnel
Credits adapted from the liner notes of Touch.

 Laura Branigan – vocals
 David Kershenbaum – production
 Bob Marlette – arrangements, keyboards, drum programming, guitars, string arrangements
 Kim Scharnberg – string arrangements, conducting
 Kenneth G. Kugler – copyist
 Julie Ann Gigante, Ralph D. Morrison III, Clayton Haslop, Alexander Horvath, R.F. Peterson, Arthur Zadinsky, Michael Nowak, Raymond J. Tischer II, Margot MacLaine, Armen Ksjikian, Dennis Karmazyn, Michael Matthews – strings
 David J. Holman – engineering, mixing, PPG programming

Charts

Celine Dion version

Canadian singer Celine Dion covered "The Power of Love" for her third English-language studio album, The Colour of My Love (1993). It was produced by David Foster and released as the first single in November 1993 in North America, in December 1993 in Japan, and in early 1994 in the rest of the world. It hit number one in the US, Canada, and Australia and a top ten hit in several other countries. Billboard later ranked it as the 46th Top Love Song of All Time.

Commercial performance
Dion's version of The Power of Love became the best-selling single by a female artist of 1994 in the United States, and 8th best-selling overall, selling 900,000 copies. It became Dion's first US number-one song, topping the Billboard Hot 100 for four weeks in February 1994. It also became her first Australian chart topper and her second number-one single in Canada. The song also topped the adult contemporary charts in the United States and Canada. In the rest of the world, "The Power of Love" reached the top ten in France, United Kingdom, Belgium, Sweden and New Zealand. It was certified Platinum in the United States (selling 1.5 million copies) and Australia, Gold in the UK and New Zealand, and Silver in France.

Accolades
"The Power of Love" won the ASCAP Pop Award for Most Performed Song in the United States. Dion was also nominated for the Grammy Award for Best Female Pop Vocal Performance, the American Music Award for Favorite Pop/Rock Single, two Billboard Music Awards for Hot 100 Single of the Year and Hot Adult Contemporary Single of the Year, and for the Juno Award for Single of the Year. David Foster was also nominated for the Juno Award for Producer of the Year for Dion's version.

Promotion/Live performances
A music video for the Celine Dion version was released which saw heavy rotation on many music video networks and programs.

Dion included the song in many of her tour performances. "The Power of Love" is included on many of her live albums. It is also featured on several of her greatest hits collections such as All the Way... A Decade of Song (1999), Complete Best (2008), My Love: Essential Collection (2008) and The Best of Celine Dion & David Foster (2012). Live performances are included on À l'Olympia (album), Live à Paris (album), Live à Paris (video), Au cœur du stade (video), Live in Las Vegas: A New Day... (video), Taking Chances World Tour: The Concert (album/video), and Céline une seule fois / Live 2013 (album/video). She also performed the song at the American Music Awards of 1995 and her CBS television special That's Just the Woman in Me on February 15, 2008.

Critical reception
Dion's cover of "The Power of Love" received acclaim from music critics. About.com placed the song at number seven in their ranking of "Top 10 Celine Dion Songs", calling it a "big ballad". Stephen Thomas Erlewine from AllMusic "highlighted" it in his review of The Colour of My Love. A reviewer from The Baltimore Sun wrote that the singer "sounds great" when she's working with "tunefully romantic stuff". Dave Sholin from the Gavin Report commented, "A song this powerful places extraordinary demands on those who sing it. Only a rare few are up to the task... Add Celine's interpretation to producer David Foster's arrangement and the result is nothing short of superb".

Another editor, Ron Fell said "it's made better than ever", adding it as "awesome!" Caroline Sullivan from The Guardian described it as a "bodice-bursting" version. Mike Wass from Idolator complimented Dion's "flawless vocal" on a "classy" Foster arrangement. Dennis Hunt from LA Times compared Dion's vocals favorably to those of Whitney Houston and Mariah Carey. He noted "that grandiose, note-stretching finish". Pan-European magazine Music & Media described the song as a "tender rendition". Alan Jones from Music Week said it "is so powerful it's sure to score". A reviewer from The Network Forty declared it "a reflective ballad brought to life by Celine's brilliantly distinctive vocals". The Plain Dealer deemed it a "soaring rendition". Christopher Smith from Talk About Pop Music viewed the song as "powerful and faithful to the original version".

Cultural impact
Siren kings, members of a New Zealand street subculture devoted to the volume and clarity of music via public address system loudspeakers, value the Celine Dion version of "The Power of Love" as a perfect song for the medium. Siren king Purp Ci'i stated that it "will smash anyone in a battle—that song is dangerous...It's an old favourite from when sirens first started."

Credits and personnel
Producer – David Foster
Engineers – David Reitzas, Humberto Gatica
Assistant engineers – Bill Leonard, Erich Baron, Fred Kelly
Mix – Humberto Gatica
Vocal – Celine Dion
Keyboards – David Foster
Synclavier programming – Simon Franglen
Guitars – Michael Thompson 
Credits adapted from the album liner notes.

Track listings

Charts

Weekly charts

Year-end charts

Decade-end charts

All-time charts

Certifications and sales

Release history

Other cover versions

The Spanish version of Jennifer Rush's "The Power of Love," "Si tu eres mi hombre y yo tu mujer" was introduced by Dominican singer Angela Carrasco in 1986 and became very popular throughout Latin America. The same version was later recorded by a number of Latin artists including Yolandita Monge, Amanda Miguel, and La India. La India's version of the song peaked at number thirty-eight on Hot Latin Songs chart in the United States. Brazilian singer Rosana recorded a Portuguese version of the song, titled "O Amor e Power", which was included on the soundtrack of 8PM prime time telenovela Mandala (1987–88), as the theme song for lead character Jocasta (Vera Fischer). Her version was largely successful, becoming the sixth most played song in the country in 1988, as well as Rosana's biggest hit. It was also included on the tracklist for her album Coração Selvagem and propelled its sales, selling over 300,000 copies. Wilfrido Vargas's New York Band covered the song in merengue which peaked at number thirty-seven on the Hot Latin Songs chart. It was also covered by Los Melódicos and Dulce López from La Academia. Italian dance act Fits of Gloom released their version in 1994 with vocals by British singer Lizzy Mack which reached No. 49 on the UK Singles Chart.

See also

1985 in British music
Billboard Year-End Hot 100 singles of 1994
List of Australian chart achievements and milestones
List of best-selling singles of the 1980s in the United Kingdom
List of Billboard Hot 100 number ones of 1994
List of Billboard Hot 100 number-one singles of the 1990s
List of Billboard Hot 100 top-ten singles in 1994
List of Hot Adult Contemporary number ones of 1994
List of million-selling singles in the United Kingdom
List of number-one singles from the 1980s (New Zealand)
List of number-one singles in Australia during the 1980s
List of number-one singles in Australia during the 1990s
List of number-one singles of 1985 (Ireland)
List of number-one singles of 1986 (Canada)
List of number-one singles of 1986 (Spain)
List of number-one singles of 1994 (Canada)
List of top 25 singles for 1985 in Australia
List of top 25 singles for 1994 in Australia
List of top 40 singles for 1980–1989 in Australia
List of UK Singles Chart number ones of the 1980s
List of UK top-ten singles in 1994
RPM Year-End
VG-lista 1964 to 1994

References

External links

1984 songs
1984 singles
1985 singles
1986 singles
1987 singles
1993 singles
1994 singles
1998 singles
Air Supply songs
Arista Records singles
Atlantic Records singles
Billboard Hot 100 number-one singles
CBS Records singles
Celine Dion songs
Columbia Records singles
Elisabeth Andreassen songs
Epic Records singles
Irish Singles Chart number-one singles
Jennifer Rush songs
La India songs
Laura Branigan songs
Number-one singles in Australia
Number-one singles in Austria
Number-one singles in New Zealand
Number-one singles in Norway
Number-one singles in South Africa
Number-one singles in Spain
Pop ballads
RMM Records singles
RPM Top Singles number-one singles
Song recordings produced by David Foster
Song recordings produced by David Kershenbaum
Song recordings produced by Peter Collins (record producer)
Songs with lyrics by Mary Susan Applegate
Sten & Stanley songs
UK Singles Chart number-one singles
1980s ballads